Madonna della Strada is a hamlet (frazione) of Scoppito, in the Province of L'Aquila, Italy.

Geography
The village is situated on the national road "SS 17". The southern part of it belongs to the municipality of Tornimparte.

External links
Info on the website of Scoppito
Tornimparte Webinfo

Frazioni of the Province of L'Aquila
Scoppito